Crimson Moon is the 21st album by Scottish folk musician Bert Jansch, released in 2000. Johnny Marr and Bernard Butler play guitar on the album.

Critical reception
NPR deemed the album "quietly stunning." The Guardian called it "unremittingly pleasant." The Birmingham Post wrote that "the earnestness of 1998's Toy Balloon gives way here to some of Bert's finest singing and picking, bringing a loose, jazzy vitality to the title track, revisiting his roots on 'Caledonia' and producing an emotive reading of Robin Williamson's 'October Song'."

Track listing

Personnel 
 Bert Jansch - guitar, vocals
 Johnny Marr - guitar, harmonica, backing vocals
 Bernard Butler - guitar
 Johnny "Guitar" Hodge - guitar, harmonica
 Loren Jansch - vocals
 Adam Jansch - bass
 Makoto Sakamoto - drums, percussion

References 

Bert Jansch albums
2000 albums